Chloropterus politus is a species of leaf beetle from Iran and Oman. It was first described from Minab by French entomologists Nicole Berti and Michel Rapilly in 1973.

References

Eumolpinae
Beetles of Asia
Beetles described in 1973
Insects of Iran
Insects of the Arabian Peninsula